Safe Trip Home is the third studio album by Dido. It was released in the United Kingdom on 17 November 2008. The album features collaborations and production with Jon Brion, her brother Rollo Armstrong, Brian Eno, Mick Fleetwood, Citizen Cope and Questlove. The album was the 44th best-selling album worldwide of 2008, according to IFPI. In the UK the album was certified gold, which was a massive drop from her previous album which went nine-times platinum. The album was nominated for a Grammy Award in the category Best Engineered Album, Non-Classical.

Release
The album's cover artwork and track listing were revealed by Dido's official website on 5 September 2008. The album was originally due to be released on 3 November, but was delayed for two weeks due to manufacturing delays. In the UK, the album launch was heralded with a special listening party, which fans can win an invitation to through the Nectar loyalty card points scheme.

The album cover features a photograph of astronaut Bruce McCandless II during a spacewalk, as part of the 1984 Space Shuttle mission STS-41-B. McCandless later sued Dido, Sony Music Entertainment and Getty Images over violating his publicity rights. The case was settled under undisclosed terms on 14 January 2011.

On 27 October 2008, it was announced that eleven short films were being produced to accompany the tracks on the album, based around the theme of home.

Critical reception

The album received very positive reviews. Metacritic rates the album at 74 out of a 100. Stephanie Merritt from The Guardian wrote "This album is a mature and thoughtful collection of songs and a fine memorial to her father, who would have been right to be proud." While Chris Willman from Entertainment Weekly said "The emotion in these sad, subtle songs seems inherent enough, though you may still find yourself wishing she'd allowed the slightest hint of it to creep into her voice." Will Hermes of Rolling Stone said: "Dido's voice is so comforting, you almost miss the blues it conceals."

Sal Cinquemani of Slant Magazine gave a more critical review: "The album might be Dido's least adventurous to date, [with] her brand of vanilla soul going down like a warm cup of milk on tracks like the lead single "Don't Believe in Love" and "Quiet Times", the lyrics of which pretty much capture her overall state of mind: "My home is home and I'm settled now/I've made it through the restless phase." Though he noted that there was a "timeless quality to the songwriting and production." Elizabeth Goodman of Blender was also more critical. "The songs are ostensibly sad but [they are] as pleasant as a pile of warm, unfolded laundry. ...Dido should let her socks go unsorted for a while; genuine sorrow sounds good on her." Regardless of the album's late release in the year, it was ranked No. 50 in Qs 50 Best Albums of the Year 2008. In 2010, the album was nominated for the Grammy Award for Best Engineered Album, Non-Classical.

Singles
Two singles were released from the album. On 22 August 2008, the day that the album's title was announced, the track "Look No Further" was released as a free digital download through her official website. The first official single from Safe Trip Home, "Don't Believe in Love", was released on 27 October 2008. It was also made available on iTunes stores internationally from 29 October. The second single, "Quiet Times", was released in February 2009.

Track listing
Credits adapted from the album's liner notes.

PersonnelMusicians Dido Armstrong – vocals, drums, guitar, omnichord, bells, additional keyboards, piano
 Mark Bates – programming, editing, keyboards, piano
 Jon Brion – keyboards, guitar, bass guitar, celeste, cello, additional percussion, drum machine
 Sister Bliss – keyboards, bass guitar, programming
 Brian Eno – additional keyboards
 Joel Shearer – additional guitar
 Sebastian Steinberg – bass guitar
 Justin Meldal-Johnsen – bass guitar
 Mick Fleetwood – drums
 Jim Scott – drums
 Questlove – drums
 Matt Chamberlain – drums, percussion
 Citizen Cope – drums, backing vocals, guitar on Burnin Love
 Lenny Castro – percussion
 David Campbell – string arranger (tracks 2, 4, 8), orchestra arranger and conductor (tracks 2, 4, 8) 
 Gavyn Wright – session leader
 Eric Gorfain – orchestration
 Michael Price – orchestration
 Matt Robertson – orchestrationProduction'

 Chris Bolster – studio staff
 Jon Brion – mixer (track 3, 5, 6, 9, 11), orchestra arranger and conductor (tracks 1, 3, 5, 6, 9, 11)
 Nick Braun – studio staff
 Bobby Campbell – studio staff
 Eric Caudieux – programming/editing (tracks 1, 3, 4, 5, 6, 9, 11)
 Peter Edge – album mastering (at A&R)
 Isobel Griffiths – contractor
 Grippa – mixer (track 8)
 Kayt Jones – photographer
 Rouble Kapoor – studio staff
 Greg Koller – mixer (tracks 3, 5, 6, 9, 11)
 Peter Leak – manager
 Josh Newell – studio staff
 Alex Pavlides – studio staff
 Bret Rausch – studio assistant for Jon Brion
 Joanne Rooks – designer
 Jim Scott – mixer (track 2, 4, 7, 10), vocal and string mixer (track 8)
 Wesley Seidman – studio staff
 Paul Smith – studio staff
 Todd Steinhauer – assistant mixer (track 2, 4, 7, 10)
 Jill Streater – copyist
 Brady Woodcock – studio staff
 Alan Yoshida – album mastering (at Ocean Way)

Charts

Weekly charts

Year-end charts

Certifications

References

External links
Album's official website

2008 albums
Albums produced by Jon Brion
Cheeky Records albums
Dido (singer) albums
RCA Records albums